The openness Index is an economic metric calculated as the ratio of a country's total trade, the sum of exports plus imports, to the country's gross domestic product. = (Exports + Imports)/(Gross Domestic Product)

The interpretation of the openness index is, the higher the index, the larger the influence of trade on domestic activities and the stronger that country's economy.

References

Gross domestic product